The Jersey is an American comedy television series based on the Monday Night Football Club books by Gordon Korman. The series aired on Disney Channel from January 30, 1999, to March 23, 2004.

Premise
Nick Lighter, Morgan Hudson, Coleman Galloway, and Elliot Riffkin are four teenagers who discover the magic of "the jersey", a mystical football jersey that transports them into the bodies of professional athletes. This is done in a way that is very similar to how "Sam", the main character in Quantum Leap, travels from body to body, and there is a different athlete featured in every episode. The show had several athletes as guest actors, including Dan Lyle, Michael Andretti, Terrell Davis, David Robinson, Malik Rose, Tony Gonzalez, Shannon Sharpe, Donovan McNabb, Tim Couch, Byron Dafoe, Michael Strahan, Kurt Warner, Stephon Marbury, Sergei Fedorov, Kordell Stewart, Jerome Bettis, Junior Seau, Scott Steiner, Booker T, Eddie George, Sabrina Bryan, Randy Johnson, Tony Hawk, Laila Ali, Peyton Manning, and Danny Farmer.

Cast
 Michael Galeota as Nick Lighter
 Courtnee Draper as Morgan Hudson
 Jermaine Williams as Coleman Galloway
 Brianne Prather as Hilary Lighter
 Cheselka Leigh as Willa Conklin
 Theo Greenly as Elliot Rifkin
 Michael Bofshever as Mr. Lighter
 McNally Sagal as Mrs. Lighter
 Meagan Good as Tamika
 Vance Yudell as Phill Parker

Production
The series began production in 1998 with the filming of the pilot episode, "The Magic Jersey", which aired on Disney Channel as a mid-season special on January 30, 1999. However, its main run wouldn't start until later that fall with the airing of "In Training", which is listed as episode 2 despite being the first episode of the show's main run. The series aired for three seasons, and while production on the show wrapped in April 2001, new episodes were shown until March 2004. The last few episodes aired early Saturday mornings on Disney Channel and after all 64 episodes were shown, The Jersey was completely taken off the air in June 2004.

Episodes

References

External links 
 

1999 American television series debuts
2004 American television series endings
1990s American teen sitcoms
2000s American teen sitcoms
American sports television series
Disney Channel original programming
English-language television shows
Television series about teenagers
Television series by Disney